CleanTech Park is an eco-business park in Singapore, the first in the nation.  R&D and test-bedding site for early adoption of green technology and solutions. Under development in three phases with a proposed completion year of 2030, the Park's first multi-tenanted building, CleanTech One, was opened in October 2010. The  site is located adjacent to Nanyang Technological University, which plans an integration between the sites as part of its own expansion. In addition to focusing on hosting environmentally friendly industry, the complex is being developed by JTC Corporation with an eye towards environmentally responsible practices, with "green" buildings and maintenance of natural terrain. Together with other precincts such as Nanyang Technological University, Bulim, Tengah, Bahar and CleanTech Park & LaunchPad @ JID forms the future 600-hectare Jurong Innovation District.

CleanTech Park currently consist of the following buildings:

 CleanTech One
 CleanTech Two
 Launchpad @ JID

References

2010 establishments in Singapore
Sustainable urban planning
Business parks
Industrial buildings in Singapore
Nanyang Technological University